Year 1001 (MI) was a common year starting on Wednesday (link will display the full calendar) of the Julian calendar. It is the first year of the 11th century and the 2nd millennium.

Events 
 By place 

 Africa 
 Khazrun ben Falful, from the Maghrawa family Banu Khazrun, begins ruling Tripoli, on the African continent.

 Asia 
 March 17 –  The Buddhist ruler of Butuan, in the Philippines (P’u-tuan in the Sung Dynasty records), Sari Bata Shaja, makes the first tributary mission to China.
 The Changbai Mountains volcano, located on the present-day Chinese-Korean border, erupts with a force of 6.5, the fourth largest Holocene blast (approximate date).
 The Tao/Tayk region is annexed by the Byzantines, as the Theme of Iberia.
 Mahmud of Ghazni, Muslim leader of Ghazni, begins a series of raids into northern India, establishing the Ghaznavid Empire across most of today's Afghanistan, eastern Iran, and Pakistan.
 Battle of Peshawar: Jayapala suffers defeat from the Ghaznavid Empire. 
 Former emperor Đinh Phế Đế dies, while suppressing the Cửu Long Rebellion in Thanh Hoa Province.
 Khmer King Jayavarman V is succeeded by Udayadityavarman I, and/or Suryavarman I.
 Construction begins on the Liaodi Pagoda, the tallest pagoda in Chinese history (completed in 1055).
 Japan
 January 13 – Empress consort Fujiwara no Teishi dies in childbirth.
 November – The imperial palace is destroyed by fire.
 70th birthday and longevity ceremony of Fujiwara no Bokushi (mother-in-law of Fujiwara no Michinaga, grandmother of Empress Shōshi).
 40th birthday of Empress dowager Senshi (mother of Emperor Ichijō).

 Europe 
 February 6 – After leading the revolt against Emperor Otto III and expelling the Crescentii, Gregory I, Count of Tusculum is named "Head of the Republic".
 July 31 – Emperor Otto III confirms the possessions of Ulric Manfred II of Turin, and grants him privileges.
 July – Sergius II becomes Patriarch of Constantinople.
 Byzantine Emperor Basil II attempts to reconquer Bulgaria.
 Robert II, King of France, marries for the third time, with Constance Taillefer d'Arles.
 Otto III, Holy Roman Emperor has Charlemagne's vault opened at Aachen Cathedral.
 The First Battle of Alton: Danish invaders defeat the English.
 Battle of Pinhoe: Vikings defeat the Anglo-Saxons in Devon.
 Bolesław I of Poland begins ruling parts of Slovakia.
 Bryachislav of Polotsk begins ruling Polotsk.
 Werner I, Bishop of Strasbourg begins ruling the Archbishopric of Strasbourg.
 Ermengol I of Urgell makes his second voyage to Rome.
 Þorgeirr Ljósvetningagoði ends being a lawspeaker in Iceland's Althing.
 Ælfgar, bishop of Elmham, is consecrated.
 Æthelred becomes bishop of Cornwall, but dies shortly afterwards.
 The town of Lloret de Mar is founded in Catalonia.
 The first reference is made to Khotyn, Ukrainian town, and to Nyalka, Hungarian village, as to Chimudi.
 Brian Boru attacks the Ui Neill in Ireland.

 North America 
 Vikings, led by Leif Eriksson, establish small settlements in and around Vinland in North America (approximate date).

 By topic 

 Religion 
 King Edward the Martyr of England is canonized.
 The Roman Catholic Metropolitan Archdiocese of Esztergom is established.
 Oqropiri (Ioane I), Svimeon III and Melkisedek I are Catholicoi of Iberia within one year.
 A tomb of Saint Ivo (possibly) is uncovered in Huntingdonshire, England.

Births 
 March 29 – Sokkate, Burmese king (d. 1044)
 Al-Qa'im, Abbasid caliph (d. 1075)
 Duncan I, king of Alba (Scotland) (d. 1040)
 Godwin, English nobleman (d. 1053)
 Herluin de Conteville, Norman nobleman (d. 1066)
 Ingegerd Olofsdotter, Grand Princess of Kiev (d. 1050)

Deaths 
 January 13 – Fujiwara no Teishi, empress of Japan (b. 977)
 January 22 – Al-Muqallad ibn al-Musayyab, Uqaylid emir of Mosul
 October 7 – Æthelstan, bishop of Elmham
 December 21 – Hugh, margrave of Tuscany
 Conrad, margrave of Ivrea
 David III of Tao ("the Great"), Georgian prince
 Đinh Phế Đế, Vietnamese emperor (b. 974) 
 Ermengarda de Vallespir, Spanish countess
 Izyaslav, Kievan prince of Polotsk
 Ja'far ibn al-Furat, Ikhshidid and Fatimid vizier (b. 921)
 Jayapala, Indian ruler of the Hindu Shahi
 Jayavarman V, emperor of the Khmer Empire
 Wang Yucheng, Chinese official and poet (b. 954)
 Ziri ibn Atiyya, emir of Morocco

References